Psora taurensis is a species of terricolous (ground-dwelling), squamulose lichen in the family Lecanoraceae. It is found in the Taurus Mountains of Turkey.

Taxonomy

Psora taurensis was formally described as a new species in 2017 by Ernst Timdal, Mika Bendiksby, Arife Merve Kahraman, and Mehmet Gökhan Halıcı. The lichen's occurrence in the Taurus Mountains is alluded to in the species epithet taurensis. Molecular phylogenetic analysis shows that Psora tenuifolia is a sister species.

Description

Psora taurensis has a squamulose thallus, with the individual squamules measuring up to 8 mm wide; the thallus develops concave lobes. The upper surface of the thallus is dull and brown, with pruina covering the outer part of the lobes. The lower thallus surface is white to pale brown. Apothecia are brownish-black, convex and lacking a distinct margin, with a diameter of up to 1.5 mm in diameter. The ascospores are ellipsoid and hyaline, measuring 11–16 by 5.5–7 μm.

Psora taurensis contains norstictic acid, a lichen product that can be detected using thin-layer chromatography. This substance is present as crystals in the medulla, along with crystals of calcium oxalate. The expected results of standard chemical spot tests on this species are medulla K+ (yellow turning red), C–, KC–, and P+ (orange).

Habitat and distribution
The habitats at these places are a rocky area with shrubland vegetation in one, and an open pasture in the other.

References

Lecanorales
Lichen species
Lichens described in 2017
Lichens of Western Asia
Taxa named by Einar Timdal